The Order of Saint Lazarus was a Catholic military order founded around 1119 in the Kingdom of Jerusalem.

Order of Saint Lazarus may also refer to:

Orders of chivalry 
 Order of Saints Maurice and Lazarus, established 1572 by the House of Savoy as a successor to the original order
 Royal and Military Order of our Lady of Mount Carmel and Saint Lazarus of Jerusalem united, active 1608-1830 in France

Other 
 Order of Saint Lazarus (statuted 1910), an international and ecumenical order
 Malta-Paris obedience
 Orléans obedience
 Jerusalem obedience: Saint Lazare International, allegedly "restored" in 2012 under Administrator General Prince Sixtus Henry of Bourbon-Parma, with seat in Seedorf, Switzerland
 United Grand Priories of the Order of Saint Lazarus of Jerusalem, founded in 1995 in Malta by inspiration of the original order
 Lazarus Union, founded in 2010 in Vienna, Austria
 Military and Hospitaller Order of Saint Lazarus of Jerusalem - Malta, effectively established in 2013 by Prince Pieter Cantacuzino, with seat in Marsa, Malta